Black Art: In the Absence of Light is an 2021 American documentary film, directed and produced by Sam Pollard. The film follows various Black American artists and their contributions to the art world.

The film was released on February 9, 2021, by HBO.

Synopsis
The film begins and then returns to focus on the landmark exhibition Two Centuries of Black American Art curated by David Driskell at the Los Angeles County Museum of Art (LACMA) in Los Angeles, California and then goes on to  follow various Black American artists and their contributions to the art world and before and since the watershed survey.

Radcliffe Bailey, Sanford Biggers, Jordan Casteel, David Driskell, Theaster Gates, Lyle Ashton Harris, Glenn Ligon, Kerry James Marshall, Richard Mayhew, Faith Ringgold, Betye Saar, Amy Sherald, Hank Willis Thomas, Kara Walker, Carrie Mae Weems, and Kehinde Wiley appear in the documentary.

Driskell died before the production's release and a posthumous dedication is made to him at the end of the film.

Release
The film was released on February 9, 2021, by HBO.

Reception

Critical reception
Black Art: In the Absence of Light received positive reviews from film critics. The review aggregator website Rotten Tomatoes surveyed  and, categorizing the reviews as positive or negative, assessed 11 as positive and 1 as negative for a 92% rating. Among the reviews, it determined an average rating of 6.80 out of 10. On Metacritic, the film holds a rating of 73 out of 100, based on 4 critics, indicating "generally favorable reviews".

References

External links
 
 
 
 

2021 documentary films
2021 films
American documentary films
Documentary films about visual artists
African-American art
Documentary films about African Americans
HBO documentary films
2020s English-language films
2020s American films